Aniello Falcone (15 November 16001656) was an Italian Baroque painter, active in Naples and noted for his painted depictions of battle scenes. Some sources refer to him as Ancillo Falcone.

Biography

Born in Naples the son of a tradesman, he showed his artistic tendency at an early age. He first received some instruction from a relative, before becoming one of the most prominent pupils of José de Ribera.

He is best known for his battle scenes, their subjects taken from both biblical and secular history, and was nicknamed L'Oracolo delle Battaglie. He gained  an international reputation; his works attracted the attention of the Flemish dealer and collector Gaspar Roomer, who sold his work across Europe, and he was one of the artists commissioned by Philip IV of Spain to paint a series of scenes from ancient Roman history for the Buen Retiro palace. He also painted various religious subjects such as the signed and dated Rest on the Flight to Egypt of 1641 (Naples Cathedral) and his frescoes for the chapel of Sant' Agata In S. Paolo Maggiore, Naples of around the same time.<ref name=naples153>Painting in Naples: From Caravaggio to Giordano, 1981, p.153</ref>

The attribution of his battle scenes is complicated by the similarity of those of his pupil Andrea di Leone, with which they have often been confused.

During the insurrection against Spanish rule led by Masaniello in 1647, he resolved to be bloodily avenged for the death, at the hands of two Spaniards, of a nephew and of a pupil in the school of art which he had established in Naples. Salvator Rosa, Carlo Coppola, among others, and he formed an armed band called the Compagnia della Morte  ("Company of Death").

When the revolt was crushed, Falcone and Rosa made off to Rome, where Borgognone noticed the works of Falcone, and became his friend, and a Frenchman induced him to go to France, where Louis XIV became one of his patrons. Ultimately Jean-Baptiste Colbert obtained permission for the painter to return to Naples, where he died during the plague of 1656.

Two of his battle-pieces are in the Louvre and in the Naples museum; he painted a portrait of Masaniello, and engraved a few plates. His pupils included Salvator Rosa and  Carlo Coppola,  Domenico Gargiulo (known as Micco Spadaro), Paolo Porpora and Andrea di Lione.

Gallery

References

Additional sources
Pierluigi Leone De Castris, Aniello Falcone, the Velàzquez of Naples, Elio de Rosa editor, 2022

Sources

External linksJusepe de Ribera, 1591-1652'', a full text exhibition catalog from The Metropolitan Museum of Art, which includes material on Aniello Falcone (see index)

1600 births
1665 deaths
17th-century Neapolitan people
17th-century Italian painters
Italian male painters
Italian Baroque painters
Painters from Naples
Italian battle painters